Rampal Singh  is an Indian politician. He is a former member of the Madhya Pradesh Legislative Assembly representing Beohari for the Indian National Congress.
He was elected in the 2013 general election.

See also
Madhya Pradesh Legislative Assembly
2013 Madhya Pradesh Legislative Assembly election

References

Madhya Pradesh MLAs 2013–2018
Indian National Congress politicians from Madhya Pradesh
Living people
1976 births
People from Shahdol